Francis Amyot (September 14, 1904 – November 21, 1962) was a Canadian sprint canoeist who competed in the 1930s. He won Canada's only gold medal at the 1936 Summer Olympics.

Biography
Amyot was born in Thornhill, Ontario. On June 18, 1933 Amyot saved Ottawa Rough Riders Dave Sprague and Eddie Bond from drowning, when their canoe overturned on Lake Deschenes.

Amyot won Canada's only gold medal at the 1936 Summer Olympics in the C-1 1000m canoeing event. This proved embarrassing to Canadian officials who had refused to pay his way. In 1936, Britannia Boating Club raised money for Frank Amyot's Olympic Fund campaign. When he won the 1000 meter championship in the 1936 Olympic Games, Frank Amyot of BYC raced the Canadian canoe, which is different from the type of canoe he had raced in Canadian Canoe Association meets. Although he had seen blueprints, Amyot paddled the Canadian canoe for the first time during the final training stages in Germany.
On July 18, 1942, Lieutenant Frank Amyot attended a meeting of 17 Britannia Boating Club members, in army and civilian war jobs during World War II, at Holborn Restaurant in London, England.

When his body was examined by medical personnel during an autopsy, they found cancer all over his body, which they believe is the cause of his death.

Legacy
Amyot was inducted into the Canadian Olympic Hall of Fame in 1949 and Canada's Sports Hall of Fame in 1955.

In 1964, the Britannia Yacht Club presented the Frank Amyot Memorial Trophy awarded to Junior Men C-15 Canoe Kayak Canada Canadian Sprint Canoe Kayak Championships, in loving memory of Frank Amyot, a life member of the club, Olympic Single Blade Singles C-1 Gold Medallist (1936), and distinguished member of Canada's Sports Hall of Fame.

In 2012, the Britannia Yacht Club stairwell featured a display with a photo of Frank Amyot and a collection of his trophies.

References

Frank Amyot Canadian Encyclopedia 
Wallechinsky, David and Jaime Loucky (2008). "Canoeing: Men's Canadian Singles 1000 Meters". In The Complete Book of the Olympics: 2008 Edition. london: Aurum Press Limited. p. 479.

1904 births
1962 deaths
Canadian male canoeists
Canoeists at the 1936 Summer Olympics
Olympic canoeists of Canada
Olympic gold medalists for Canada
Olympic medalists in canoeing
Medalists at the 1936 Summer Olympics
People from Thornhill, Ontario
Deaths from cancer in Ontario